Hanifi Rohingya is a Unicode block containing characters for Hanifi Rohingya script used for writing the Rohingya language in Myanmar and Bangladesh.

Block

History
The following Unicode-related documents record the purpose and process of defining specific characters in the Hanifi Rohingya block:

References 

Unicode blocks